Howard Staehr (born 30 March 1955) is a former Australian rules footballer who played with Essendon in the Victorian Football League (VFL). Recruited from Horsham, he played with Essendon's under-19s in 1973 before moving on to the senior list in 1974. He played five senior games over three seasons, though he missed 1975 entirely due to a broken leg. Staehr later played two seasons with Brunswick in the Victorian Football Association and also spent a year playing for Hawthorn's reserves.

Staehr is also a former professional runner.

Notes

External links 
		

Essendon Football Club past player profile

Living people
1955 births
Australian rules footballers from Victoria (Australia)
Essendon Football Club players
Horsham Football Club players
Brunswick Football Club players